Puerto Sandino is a coastal town in western Nicaragua. Prior to the 1979 revolution it was known as Puerto Somoza. Due to its crude oil supply line, it is a major port, and also plays a large role in Nicaragua's fishing industry.  Puerto Sandino is an extremely popular location for surfing.

U.S. attacks 
While supporting the Contras in the 1980s, U.S. forces attacked Puerto Sandino on September 13 and October 14 of 1983. On March 28 and March 30, 1984, U.S. forces attacked patrol boats at Puerto Sandino.

References

Populated places in Nicaragua
Populated coastal places in Nicaragua
León Department